Climbazole is a topical antifungal agent commonly used in the treatment of human fungal skin infections such as dandruff and eczema. Climbazole has shown a high in vitro and in vivo efficacy against Malassezia spp. that appear to play an important role in the pathogenesis of dandruff. Its chemical structure and properties are similar to other fungicides such as ketoconazole and miconazole.


Indications and formulations
It is most commonly found as an active ingredient in OTC anti-dandruff and anti-fungal products, including shampoos, lotions and conditioners. It may be accompanied by other active ingredients such as zinc pyrithione or triclosan.

Side effects
May cause localized irritation of the skin with symptoms including redness, rashes and itching.

References 

Phenol ethers
Chloroarenes
Ketones
Imidazole antifungals